is a railway station on the Nanao Line in the city of Hakui, Ishikawa Prefecture, Japan, operated by the West Japan Railway Company (JR West).

Lines

Station layout
The station consists of one side platform and one island platform connected by a footbridge. The station has a Midori no Madoguchi staffed ticket office.

Platforms

Adjacent stations

History
The station opened on April 24, 1898. With the privatization of Japanese National Railways (JNR) on April 1, 1987, the station came under the control of JR West.

Passenger statistics
In fiscal 2015, the station was used by an average of 1,289 passengers daily (boarding passengers only).

Surrounding area

Hakui City Hall
Hakui Post Office
Hakui Elementary School
Hakui Junior High School

See also
 List of railway stations in Japan

References

External links

  

Railway stations in Ishikawa Prefecture
Stations of West Japan Railway Company
Railway stations in Japan opened in 1898
Nanao Line
Hakui, Ishikawa